"I Like Dreamin'" is the debut single by Kenny Nolan, taken from his eponymous debut album. The recording was issued as the album's lead single in October 1976, spending 27 weeks on the U.S. Billboard Hot 100.

Background
The song tells about a man who dreams about an apparently unattainable woman with whom he shares intimate moments, a romantic walk on a beach and, as their love grows, raising a family. He likes these dreams but, of course, always wakes to find that his longed-for lover is "just not there".

Chart performance
It slowly crawled to number three on both that chart as well as the Cash Box Top 100 by early March 1977. The song became a gold record.
"I Like Dreamin'" was an equally large hit in Canada, where it peaked at number three on the Pop Singles chart and was also a number-one hit on the Adult Contemporary chart.

Weekly charts

Year-end charts

References

External links
 

1976 debut singles
1976 songs
20th Century Fox Records singles
Songs written by Kenny Nolan
Kenny Nolan songs
Songs about loneliness
Songs about dreams